New Zealand's Next Top Model, Season 2 is the second season of New Zealand's Next Top Model, a reality TV show based on America's Next Top Model. Auditions started on 5 June 2010 in Auckland and ended on 13 June 2010 in Tauranga. Fourteen young women compete for the title of New Zealand's Top Model for a chance to start their career in modeling.

The prize for this season was: A contract with 62 Model Management, 1-year contract with CoverGirl cosmetics, an 8-page editorial in CLEO magazine, an all-expense paid trip to Sydney to meet with Ursula Hufnagl of Chic Model Management, a trip to Los Angeles to meet with Alexis Borges of NEXT Model Management, and a brand new Ford Fiesta. The catchphrase for this season was "All That Glitters Is Gold".

The international destination for this Season was Phuket, Thailand for one episode with six contestants.

The winner was 19-year-old Danielle Hayes, from Kawerau, Eastern Bay of Plenty; making her the only Maori contestant to win the title.

New Zealand's Next Top Model Season 2 was aired on TV3 New Zealand from early August to late October 2010.

Contestants 
(ages stated are at start of contest)

Episode Summaries

Episode 1: All That Glitters Is Gold
Original Airdate: 6 August 2010

The first episode of New Zealand's Next Top Model Season 2 saw 33 hopefuls flown to Wellington all with the dream of becoming an international model.

Upon arriving at the Museum Hotel, the girls were each treated to a gift makeover from CoverGirl. The girls then traveled to Boomrock where Sara flew in via helicopter to meet them for the first time. Next, the contestants were each given a runway walking lesson by Judge Colin Mathura-Jeffree and international fashion designer, Alexandra Owen.

After an interview in front of all three judges, Sara Tetro, Colin Mathura-Jeffree & Chris Sisarich, the girls faced elimination. They rushed into a room with mannequins that held the name tags of the top 21 girls. The 12 girls who didn't have name tags were eliminated immediately. The remaining 21 girls each posed as Vintage Hollywood Movie Stars with Russ Flatt, one of NZ's leading photographers.

After much deliberation by the judges on how the girls performed in their photo shoot, it was time for the next elimination.
Gathered together in one room, there were tears from many of the remaining 21 as they waited for their name to be called. Sara called forward 13 girls and then in a shocking twist, she revealed that the decision on whom to take to Auckland had been too difficult and that they would actually be taking 14 girls. Holly was the 14th and final contestant to make it through the round.

Featured Photographer: Russ Flatt
Special Guest: Alexandra Owen

Episode 2: The Girls Move To The Top Model House
Original Airdate: 13 August 2010

The Girls relocate to the Top Model house and within moments of arrival, tension arises as Holly stirs up drama in the house. The girls then do a challenge to test their personal style. Some of the girls struggled but Elza was named the winner of the challenge. The girls meet with Colin and required them to be suspended in midair while posing at the same time. Most girls struggled such as Amelia who was said to be too "hoochie" and Danielle who appeared to be completely lost but it was Aafreen who outshined all the other girls with her diverse poses and her great understanding of her angles.

The girls then returned to the Top Model House and already girls have been segregated with girls talking about each other behind backs, especially Holly and Dakota who express their dislike for Amelia. The girls arrive at their first official photoshoot which is photographed by Rob Trathen. Michaela, Elza, Courtenay and Aafreen all brought elegance to their set while others failed to make an impression such as Danielle who stopped after 3 frames as she ran out of poses and didn't know what she was doing anymore. This caused her to break down in tears after her shoot.

At panel, Holly is criticized for lacking any presence in her eyes and Aafreen is praised for having the ability to appear racially ambiguous. Elza, Michaela and Eva all amaze the judges with their photos while Nellie is criticized for laughing during the challenge thus insulting their client, causing her to cry at the panel. Jamie and Estelle's amateur shots did not sit well with the judges, but it was Estelle who was the first one to be eliminated.

First Call-Out: Eva Duncan
Bottom Two: Estelle Curd & Jamie Himiona
Eliminated: Estelle Curd
Featured Photographer: Rob Trathen
Special Guests: Anna Fitzpatrick

Episode 3: The Girls Get Down And Dirty
Original Airdate: 20 August 2010

The girls start out by having a lesson at a dance studio. There, they meet Colin and his guest Taane Mete whom the girls previously met at their runway challenge during casting. The girls were taught dances from around the world which taught them movement that would help with their posing. Dakota wasn't focused or aware of her body, and Colin said Jamie had no energy and "looked anaemic". Amelia was praised for her maturity and confidence. Back at the house the girls received Sara Mail which told them to "pack their bags" getting many of the girls excited thinking it was international travel; the last line of the mail said, "get ready to roll" and Holly pointed out that it would only be a road trip.

The girls took the bus to Jamie and Amelia's hometown of Rotorua. When they arrived they met Chris who gave them their challenge for the week, it was to strike several poses inside a Zorb while it was rolling. Many of the girls struggled. Nellie got stuck in the opening of the Zorb halfway through her turn, Danielle nearly fell out and hit her head on the ground, Eva was praised for her grace and poise, but it was Courtenay who won because of her variety of poses and engagement with the camera, she picked Eva to share in her prize of a spa treatment.

This week's photoshoot was set at Hell's Gate mudpools and the girls were covered in mud and dressed in tribal jewellery and headdresses. At panel, Lara, Michaela, Elza & Danielle pulled off stellar photos. Amelia was criticized for her lack of poses and tendency to be too "hoochy". Holly was criticized for being too dependent on the photographer's direction as with Jamie and Dakota for their lackluster shots. The bottom two were Dakota for giving up at the dance lesson and her attitude and Jamie for her lack of energy and average photo. In the end, Dakota was given another chance and Jamie was eliminated.

First Call-Out: Lara Kingsbeer
Bottom Two: Dakota Biddle & Jamie Himiona
Eliminated: Jamie Himiona
Featured Photographer: Jackie Meiring
Special Guests: Taane Mete

Episode 4: The Girls Get Made Up and Over
Original Airdate: 27 August 2010
 
The episode starts with the celebration of Lauren's 17th birthday followed by Sara Mail that informed them of their impending makeovers. Lauren was displeased with the news that they were going to cut her hair short and was told by Sara that if she refused, she would be eliminated. Lauren gets her short bob cut after a tearful makeover, Lara gets her hair dyed blond, Nellie and Elza receive identical makeovers and Courtenay gets her makeover altered from long and wavey to a short Twiggy inspired cut.

MAKEOVERS:

After they are transformed, the girls show off their new looks in an Alexandra Owen runway show and after the show, the girls' challenge this week is social networking at a function room with the show's sponsors and people from the fashion industry. Dakota's immature behaviour failed to impress, Nellie and Elza received good feedback and Lauren's maturity and demeanor won her the challenge.

This week's photoshoot, the girls pose for the Louise Pilkington jewelry line with a colourful birds as their companion. At the panel, Danielle's photo redeemed her shocking catwalk and received a first call-out. Nellie and Elza were given praise for their great shots, Eva & Courtenay were also praised and Amelia and Lara were criticized for their lack of variety when it came to emotion. The bottom two were Holly for her lack of warmth in photos and Aafreen for her underwhelming shot and over-analysing. In the end, Aafreen was sent home.

First Call-Out: Danielle Hayes
Bottom Two: Aafreen Rachael Vaz & Holly Potton
Eliminated: Aafreen Rachael Vaz
Featured Photographer: Fiona Quinn
Special Guests: Paul Serville, Louise Pilkington, Alexandra Owen, Donna Gilray, Cherie Mobberley & Mark Pitt

Episode 5: The Girls Are Smokin' Hot
Original Airdate: 3 September 2010

The episode begins with the girls reading a note from Aafreen saying goodbye to all them and thanking them for the experience. Lara expresses her disbelief that Aafreen left over Holly. Later, Sara arrives at the house and takes a commercial polaroid of each girl and then introduces rugby star Dan Carter to the girls who answers their questions and gets a general feel for their personalities. After, Dan chooses a winner to become the first non-All Black to be featured on bottles for Water For Everyone and he picks Eva who goes straight to the shoot for the campaign.

Next, the girls meet with Colin and Denise Gray, a representative of Herbal Essences, who gives them the task of hitting the streets and introducing a new product to pedestrians. Amelia's confidence was blown by a negative racial comment by a man on the street, Eva was too shy, Courtenay was only remembered for her haircut, Lara was overconfident and Dakota was inappropriate once again and commented "it would be easier to sell crack". Elza performed well but it was Holly who won for her personality and quick thinking. The reward was a photoshoot for Herbal Essence which would appear in Cleo Magazine. Back at the house, Danielle was upset over a dream she had about a close friend of hers dying in a car crash which was made worse by her finding out later that it was true. Nellie said she had homesickness and that she wouldn't mind being eliminated which Elza disagreed with.

The photoshoot this week was with Duncan Cole and was for Smokefree's Smoking Not Our Future ad campaign. The girls took a black and white shot which was then turned into a promotional poster with a quote of theirs about smoking. At panel, Michaela, Lauren, Elza, Danielle and Lara were praised for their shots. Holly's photo was compared to a 35-year-old woman by the guest judge Kate Sylvester and Dakota was called out for her unprofessionalism and immaturity. The bottom two were Nellie for her average shot and Amelia for her boring photo and lack of improvement. In the end, Nellie's name was called and Amelia was eliminated. Before she left, she gave the girls some parting words of wisdom: "Chase the Dream not the Competition".
First Call-Out: Michaela Steenkamp
Bottom Two: Amelia Gough & Nellie Jenkins
Eliminated: Amelia Gough
Featured Photographer: Duncan Cole
Special Guests: Dan Carter, Kate Sylvester, Denise Gray, Claudia Rodrigues, Dave Gibson & Neil Pardington

Episode 6: The Girls Are Fit As A Fiddle
Original Airdate: 10 September 2010

The girls start off their week with a visit from Sara and her personal trainer Brad Werner. They got measured and their BMI taken. Dakota's inappropriateness came out thus slightly intimidating Brad. Later that day, they received a workout session with Brad and were given heaps of exercise equipment.

For this week's challenge, they meet with Colin and Cherie Mobberley from CoverGirl. The challenge was to apply makeup to their designated partners and give them a smokey eye using a wide range of Covergirl products. Before the challenge started, Dakota was heavily criticized by Colin on her horrible outfit and was described as being someone who lives under a bridge. During the challenge, Danielle and Eva performed horribly while Holly, Elza and Dakota performed well. Holly was picked as the winner and received a year's supply of Covergirl cosmetics.

At the photo shoot, the girls worked with photographer Tony Drayton and were shot in pairs in high fashion outfits in front of an urban graffiti setting. Courtenay, Michaela and Lara received praise while Eva and Lauren struggled. Danielle and Dakota had a bit of a trouble working together while Holly's awkward posing was criticized.

At the judging panel, Dakota sucked the life out of Danielle in their shoot and Holly's lack of warmth on her photos were criticized once again but, in the end, it was both Eva and Lauren who landed on the bottom two and were subsequently eliminated.

First Call-Out: Courtenay Scott-Hill
Bottom Two/Eliminated: Eva Duncan & Lauren Bangs
Featured Photographer: Tony Drayton
Special Guests: Brad Werner, Shelley Ferguson & Cherie Mobberley

Episode 7: The Girls Act Out
Original Airdate: 17 September 2010

The girls talk about the surprise double elimination and read the parting letters from Eva and Lauren. Elza and Nellie celebrate their 18th birthday with a dinner party. This week, the girls will go back to basics by practicing their runway walks with Colin. Colin said Dakota was trying but has a short attention span, Nellie and Elza were praised for their walks and Danielle made a big improvement despite accidentally kicking her heel off which hit Elza in the head.

The challenge this week was a model trivia, and the girls were questioned by Colin accompanied by an international Kiwi model Ella Drake. The winner was Elza and she received accessories from an assortment of designers. Back at the model house, Nellie felt the pressure as Elza was doing better than her while Danielle's hand is bandaged as we are told by Lara that she punched a hole in the wall. At the photo shoot this week, the girls had to do an over-dramatic shoot representing one of the new 8 Herbal Essences products. Russ Flatt was the photographer and was pleased with Dakota, Nellie and Elza's out there performances. He was disappointed in Lara's lack of variety, Holly's poor modeling ability in general and Danielle's tendency to get self-conscious.

At elimination panel, nearly every contestant received praise for their good shots. Lara was told her shot was good but the journey she took to get there and the feedback the received on her shoot was horrible. Holly was told her shoot was average and the judges said her eyes were dead like there was nothing behind them. Dakota got the first call-out while Holly and Lara ended up in the bottom two. In the end, Lara was given another chance and Holly's constant lack of warmth in her photos sent her home.

First Call-Out: Dakota Biddle
Bottom Two: Holly Potton & Lara Kingsbeer
Eliminated: Holly Potton
Featured Photographer: Russ Flatt
Special Guests: Denise Gray, Claudia Rodrigues, Ella Drake

Episode 8: The Girls Drive Each Other Mad
Original Airdate: 24 September 2010

The girls start off with a Lonely Hearts Lingerie runway show at church. Courtenay and Michaela were a bit apprehensive because of their religion while Dakota wanted them to pray before the show starts stating that she was Christian too, though the other girls were skeptical. All of the girls performed well except Dakota who lost her focus when she overheard someone laugh at her because of her awkward walk.

Later, the girls were greeted by Chris who told them that they would be starring in a new music video for Opshop. The girls learned the choreography and put it to use posing elegantly in wind. Then, they were told that three girls would be selected to stay late and shoot more of the video underwater. Lara, Elza and Danielle were picked, and Nellie was chosen as a fourth girl because the director liked the idea of having twins so he could get double the takes. The girls performed in the cold pool until 5 in the morning. Back in the model house, the unselected girls Dakota, Courtenay and Michaela were having dinner until Dakota decided to speak ill of Lara and her figure. Michaela found Dakota's negativity irritating thus telling her to grow up and feeling the need to punch her. Dakota said she was just being realistic and encouraged Michaela to start a fight with her.

For this week's photoshoot, Chris will be the photographer while Sara watched the girls in action. They will be posing with Ford Fiesta posing in an explosive James Bond style. Before the start of the shoot, Lara was told she was the challenge winner and won the prize. During the shoot, Dakota's uncoordinated running photographed well, Danielle's bad girl attitude worked well and Michaela's breakdown saying she was distracted for not being picked for the Opshop video didn't pan out well in her photoshoot. Elza became ill due to exhaustion from the music video and was seen to by an ambulance, Nellie was distracted during her shoot worrying about her sister. Elza came right and performed well during her shoot.

At panel, the girls were informed they were off to Phuket, Thailand but only 6 of them were going. Danielle, Courtenay, and Lara were praised for their shots and Elza was commended for completing the shoot. Dakota received good feedback on her photo, but the judges think she is more of a coincidental model and also was heavily criticized on her runway walk. Nellie was also criticized on her average photo. Danielle got the first call-out while Nellie and Dakota landed in the bottom two. Nellie for her average photo and Dakota for her awful runway walk. In the end, Dakota was saved, and Nellie was eliminated in an extremely tearful goodbye for Elza.

First Call-Out:  Danielle Hayes
Bottom Two: Dakota Biddle & Nellie Jenkins
Eliminated: Nellie Jenkins
Music Video Director Ivan Slavov
Featured Photographer: Chris Sisarich
Special Guests: Jason Kerrison & Steve Ferguson

Episode 9: The Girls Get A Second Look
Original Airdate: 1 October 2010

Recap Episode: With only six girls remaining, it's time to take an inside look at life in the Top Model house including extended scenes and never before seen footage of the girls at work, and at play.

Episode 10: The Girls Are Same-Same But Different
Original Airdate: 8 October 2010

The episode starts with the final six contestants traveling in first-class to Phuket, Thailand. In the morning, Chris gets the girls to take a kickboxing lesson, which helped with their fitness and endurance. The girls then took a break from work and had a night off at a theme park. During dinner, Sara surprises them with an unexpected visit and bluntly asked them to point out who they thought will be the bottom two this week. Almost unanimously, the girls picked Dakota. After Sara left the girls, Dakota attacked Lara verbally pointing out her body figure problems. The next day the girls went on an elephant trek and shopping trip. While most of the girls enjoyed it, Lara was disappointed that she was paired with Dakota.

The challenge this week had the girls making their own Phuket inspired outfit and wear it in an impromptu runway. Lara won the challenge due to her creativity and was awarded twenty extra frames at the photo shoot. This week's photo, the girls will be posing in swimwear in a Phuket beach with photographer Tony Drayton but with a special guest, an elephant.

At panel, Danielle, Courtenay and Elza received praise from the judges. Michaela was told she needs to give different range of looks in her face due to having one look in her previous photos. During Lara's evaluation, she calls out Dakota for her insulting comments and was told to apologize. Lara was told she performed poorly and wouldn't have had a good shot without the twenty extra frames. At Dakota's evaluation, Sara said she was disingenuous, and her behaviour was a sure-fire way to go home. Dakota was then criticized for her photo too. Lara and Dakota ended up in the bottom two. Lara for only getting one good shot in her twenty extra frames and Dakota for her behaviour and bad photoshoot. Surprisingly, Dakota was given another chance and Lara was sent home.

First Call-Out: Danielle Hayes
Bottom Two: Dakota Biddle & Lara Kingsbeer
Eliminated: Lara Kingsbeer
Featured Photographer: Tony Drayton

Episode 11: The Girls Fade Into The Background 
Original Airdate: 15 October 2010

The episode starts with the girls back at their Auckland penthouse. Dakota is immediately excluded from the other girls who are confused as to why she is still there, while Dakota praises herself for still being in the competition. Later in the day, the girls receive a surprise visit from Season One Winner Christobelle and International Model Ngahuia Williams who give the girls important tips for proper skin care underneath makeup (using Nivea Visage Products). Christobelle shares that one of the biggest problems she had when first wearing makeup was breaking out from using the wrong skin products.

The next day the girls receive Sara Mail informing them to get ready for an Infomercial. The girls arrive at an old heritage building in downtown Auckland where they are greeted by Colin and special guest Ursula Hufnagl who unknown to the girls at the time, is the owner of Chic Model Management. Hufnagl inspects the girls at work to pick up their personalities. When they start filming their campaigns, Dakota appeared too overconfident on camera, Courtenay was criticized for appearing as if she was reading from a script and Danielle coped with the stress by swearing on camera. At the end of filming Elza won the challenge with Dakota. Their prize was a trip to a restaurant where they are again greeted by Christobelle in which she hands $500 over to a tearful Elza, all to Dakota's jealousy. That night they receive Sara mail for the next day's photoshoot.

The girls arrive at Eden Gardens where they have to pose nude but alluded by full body paint portraying different fictional creatures. All of the girls amaze the photographer. Back at the house, Courtenay, Danielle and Michaela soak in a spa pool and discuss who they think should stay and go home. To no surprise, Dakota is the favourite to go home, but Courtenay worries that Elza might be sent packing. At judging, Courtenay, Danielle and Elza were praised for their photos, while Michaela was praised by Sara and Chris, but Ursula Hufnagl thinks that she looks too relaxed in a wrong setting. Elza and Dakota end up in the bottom two. Elza for her declining confidence without her twin sister, and Dakota for the repetition of mediocre photos. In the end, Dakota was sent home.

First Call-Out: Courtenay Scott-Hill
Bottom Two: Dakota Biddle and Elza Jenkins
Eliminated: Dakota Biddle
Featured Photographer: David Shields
Special Guests: Ursula Hufnagl, Christobelle Grierson-Ryrie, Ngahuia Williams & Yolanda Bartram

Episode 12: The Girls Shop Till They Drop 
Original Airdate: 22 October 2010

The episode starts with Elza confessing her nervousness from her bottom two experience last week and Danielle talking about how happy she is that Dakota was finally eliminated. Later, they receive Sara Mail informing them to get ready to take on the all-anticipated Go-See's. Michaela takes the letter and starts a chase through the house and while hiding in the toilet, Danielle sits on a seat and accidentally breaks a wall open. The next day, they arrive at a building in downtown Auckland where they are greeted by Colin who confirms that they will be doing a Go-See Challenge. Five male models from 62 Models walk in the room and they will personally drive them individually in a Ford Fiesta car to their Go-Sees.

All of the girls had a hard time navigating the city, as none of the remaining contestants were from Auckland. Elza had a hard time navigating K Road and the Central Business District while Courtenay drives on the Auckland Harbour Bridge six times in a row due to having navigation problems. At the Go-Sees, Michaela instantly impresses her first client and Danielle comes off funny and quoted as having a very valuable exotic look while Courtenay's runway walk at one Go-See was too bouncy. For the last Go-See Challenge, every contestant struggled to map their way through a downtown Auckland High School. Once they found the gym, the girls were photographed shooting a basket hoop. Michaela was the first to arrive back at The Department Store at 5pm followed by Danielle and Elza. Courtenay arrived 10 minutes late and was disqualified from receiving the prize. Colin announces that Courtenay did not get any bookings from any Go-See's because she did not deliver in any of them. Michaela impressed almost every Go-See with her charm and good looks, but it was Danielle who won the challenge for winning 9 out of 10 bookings. For this she won a Ford Fiesta Car to own for a year and became the new ambassador for Ford Fiesta.

Back at the house, Courtenay shared her sorrow and frustration to Michaela about her miserable performance at the Go-Sees. The girls receive Sara Mail the next day for the photoshoot. The girls arrive at a new Glassons clothing store in downtown Auckland where they are greeted by Chris and their photographer, Craig Owen. The girls are told that they are going to pose for new advertisements for the clothing store while portraying over dramatic feminine alter egos. Elza is up first, who instantly impresses the photographer. She is quoted as having 'a lovely angelic face'. Elza's wig for the shoot was inspired by Lady Gaga's hair bow. Courtenay comes on set and is expected to do well, but the photographer cannot connect with her, and Chris thinks that she is trying too hard because of her poor performance in the Go-Sees challenge. Michaela has an unexpected breakdown while in hair and make-up, but she still impresses the photographer and manages to get one of the best shots, even though Chris had complained that she looked like she was going to burst into tears of misery. Once back from the shoot, the girls received Sara Mail informing them of the elimination the next day. Michaela tells the girls that she feels so close but yet so far and doesn't want to be eliminated.

At judging panel, Michaela reveals that she had a minor break-down before the photoshoot due to the pressure of being in the Top 4. Courtenay cries in front of the judges due to not having any bookings in any of the Go-Sees. Elza and Michaela were praised for their photos. Danielle's photo is criticized for being plain although was commended for having the hardest set to work with and Courtenay's performance through the week let her photo down. Elza & Courtenay ended up in the bottom two. Courtenay for lacking confidence and poor over-all performance in the Go-Sees and the photoshoot. In the end, Courtenay was eliminated.

First Call-Out: Michaela Steenkamp
Bottom Two: Courtenay Scott-Hill & Elza Jenkins
Eliminated: Courtenay Scott-Hill
Featured Photographer: Craig Owen
Special Guests: Francis Hooper, Karen Iberditzen-Waller, Teresa Brady, Atip W, Chris Masterton, Guy Coombes, Di Humphries & Anjali Stewart

Episode 13: The Girl Who Is New Zealand's Next Top Model 
Original Airdate: 29 October 2010

Before the episode starts, a reminder of how the season started is played, '30 girls arrived in Wellington hoping to make their dreams come true but only 14 made it into the top model house in Auckland'. The season has seen tears, tantrums, the good the bad and the Dakota and now it is down to the final three: Michaela, the consistent 16-year-old with piercing green/blue eyes from Christchurch, Danielle the wisecracking 19-year-old who entered on a dare and Elza the competition sweetheart who blossomed. At the start of the episode Michaela shares her sympathy and difficulty she is facing without Courtenay there, but that alone will make her want to win harder, she also shares that she feels so happy and privileged. Elza and Danielle play mock dress-up and scream through the house. The girls receive Sara Mail that night informing them about the CoverGirl commercial the next day, also in the mail are three scripts that the girls must revise.

The next day the girls arrive at the CoverGirl Studio and are greeted by Colin, their commercial director Tony Drayton and their print photographer Fiona Quinn. The girls go immediately into hair & makeup. Michaela is up first who is feeling strongly confident that she will succeed in her performance. She delivers a 'flawless' commercial and Drayton is impressed by how she used her hands. When she has her CoverGirl photo, Colin calls her a breath of fresh air, and she manages to get a great shot. Danielle confesses that she couldn't be bothered learning her lines and once in front of the camera finds it nearly impossible to deliver her first sentence, in the end she has to use cue cards. She breaks down in the middle of the shoot because of her fear of failing, Colin quotes that she didn't make much effort into learning her lines. She appears relaxed in her photoshoot. Elza walks onto her commercial confident and ready. She delivers a 'good' performance and Tony Drayton quotes that she had 'Wonderful energy & looked the part. Back at the penthouse they find Sara Mail informing them of the proceeding elimination.

At judging they are told that they will be critiqued by how well they performed in their CoverGirl PhotoShoot & Commercial. Michaela is called up first and tells the judges that she felt 'beautiful' in the CoverGirl shoot. She is instantly praised for her clear happy commercial and brilliant photoshoot which showed off her piercing green eyes. The judges all agree that Michaela's effort in the CoverGirl challenge was flawless. Elza is criticized for winking and throwing her hair back in the commercial by Sara and the judges all agree that her photo looks more like an artistic portrait than a beauty shot. Danielle breaks down while standing before the judges, she is also criticized for not learning her lines by Sara and told by special guest judge Cherie Mobberley that she obviously doesn't want to be a model if she doesn't want to learn her lines. She gets a great commercial but only because of editing, but also gets a striking photo. Danielle and Elza end up in the bottom two. Elza because of lacking ability to perform in commercials and Danielle for the terrible commercial. In the end Elza is sent packing because Danielle's overall performance in the competition is better. Danielle and Michaela pack their bags for their final challenge and are flown to Wellington where the journey began 12 weeks earlier.

First Call-Out: Michaela Steenkamp
Bottom Two: Danielle Hayes & Elza Jenkins
Eliminated: Elza Jenkins
Featured Photographer: Fiona Quinn
Commercial Director: Tony Drayton

In the second half of the episode the girls arrive in Wellington and sit at the waterfront and recollect their memories of being among 30 other girls in the same place only 12 weeks earlier. They arrive at the TSB Arena and get fitted for their costumes in the WOW World Of Wearable Arts Artistic Runway Show. One of Michaela's outfits is made from horsehair and Danielles ringleader outfit required her to be fitted into a corset. They are then taken through a rundown of the route they have to take on the runway since there are 5 different runways in the show.

A couple of hours later, the stage is full of mystical creatures and bright marsion lighting. Danielle and Michaela wish each other luck backstage then go on their way. Chris, Sara & Colin are seated in the front row to get a good view of the final two. Michaela enters the runway in her first costume and is quoted to look professional and relaxed. Danielle enters and is quoted as looking nervous and overwhelmed about wearing heels. In the second half of the show, Michaela is a Viking character and Danielle, a ringleader. Danielle forgets her choreography that they had learnt earlier and puts Michaela off, leaving her to forget her dance moves as well. Michaela worries that Danielle has ruined her chances of winning now.

The girls arrive at final judging and are reminded one last time about the luxury prizes that they will be receiving. Sara reminds Danielle of how modelesque she is and reminded her of what she said on the first day 'whether you like it or not, you are a model'. Sara shares that Michaela has always been consistent throughout the season, a stunning young girl, who shows maturity well beyond her 16 years. Colin also shares that Michaela looked amazing on the runway. The girls are sent out while the judges deliberate. The judges look over the photos of the two girls throughout the season. Both girls seem to be tied on effort in their photos making it harder for the judges to find a winner. Michaela's weakness felt by the judges is that when she loses expression in her eyes, her photos are dull and her one look. While Danielle's weakness is her having difficulty to try new things and her tendency to get self-conscious. When the girls re-enter the room, Sara shares that Danielle has come a long way, hit few speed bumps but got there while Michaela has been consistent and rising in each photo. Danielle's face appears on the LCD Screen, and she is announced the winner of the second season, and thus the first unconventional beauty and to claim the title. Michaela says in an emotional interview that she is going to still pursue modeling and buy a Ford Fiesta car with her own money. Danielle cannot believe that she has just won Top Model, especially because she only entered on a dare.

Final Two: Danielle Hayes & Michaela Steenkamp
New Zealand's Next Top Model: Danielle Hayes
Final Runway: WOW, World of Wearable Arts
Special Guests: Cherie Mobberley & Denise L'estrange-Corbet

Summaries

Call-out order

 The contestant was eliminated
 The contestant won the competition

 In episode 1, the first call-out does not reflect the girls' performance that first week, additionally when the cast size was increased to 14, as Holly was put through to the competition.
 In episode 6, Eva and Lauren landed in the bottom two. Both of them were eliminated.
 Episode 9 was the Recap Episode.

Average  call-out order
Final two is not included.

Bottom two

 The contestant was eliminated after her first time in the bottom two
 The contestant was eliminated after her second time in the bottom two
 The contestant was eliminated after her third time in the bottom two
 The contestant was eliminated after their fourth time in the bottom two
 The contestant was placed as the runner-up in the final judging

Photo Shoot Guide
Episode 1 Photo Shoot: Vintage Hollywood Movie Stars (Casting)
Episode 2 Photo Shoot: Suspended Ethereal Fairies
Episode 3 Photo Shoot: Tribal Mudpool Shoot
Episode 4 Photo Shoot: Jewellery Beauty Shots with Birds
Episode 5 Photo Shoot: Smoking Not Our Future Black & White Shots and Promos
Episode 6 Photo Shoot: Demons on an Graffiti in Pairs
Episode 7 Photo Shoot: Over-dramatic Herbal Essences Shoot
Episode 8 Music Video & Photo Shoot: Opshop Music Video / Ford Fiesta Action Shoot
Episode 10 Photo Shoot: Swimwear with Elephant on Phuket Beach
Episode 11 Commercial & Photo Shoot: Own Charity Commercial / Body Painting Monsters
Episode 12 Photo Shoot: Glassons Fun Fair Shoot

Post Top Model Careers

Aafreen Vaz - Signed to Ali Mcd Models in Dunedin and 62 models in Auckland. Since the show Aafreen has walked for Tanya Carlson, Natasha Johnstone, Rekha Rana-Shailaj and has taken many test shots. She later participated in Femina Miss India 2015 and was crowned Femina Miss India Supranational 2015 at the pageant.
Amelia Gough - Amelia has taken some tests and said she might try out modeling in Japan.
Courtenay-Scott Hill - Signed to Kirsty Bunny Management in Wellington and Red 11 Management in Auckland. She has shot the Alexandra Dodds Jewelry Look book and has shot an editorial for Wassakii Magazine.
Dakota Biddle - Dakota was previously signed with August Models and shot for Blacklog.
Danielle Hayes - For winning the show she has been signed with 62 models,has shot her editorial for Cleo magazine and got a 1-year contract with CoverGirl. She met with Chic model management in Sydney and Next models in L.A. She has also been on the cover of Metro magazine and The Dominion Post, been featured in Woman's day. She also appeared on Remix Magazine and Black Magazine and has taken some test shots.
Elza Jenkins - Was signed with Ali Mcd models in Dunedin and 62 models in Auckland. Elza has been in work for Roxanna Zamani, Henry Hewat, Charlotte Mchlachlan, Mild red and more. She has walked in many runway shows for designers such as Mellisa Coulter, Brooke Fairgray, Bailey Meredith, Melanie Child, Ryoto Shiga, Wong Kwai Ching and more. She and her sister, Nellie, are currently in London to pursue modeling.
Estelle Curd - Has taken some test shots and has signed with Red 11 Models and Talent. She was crowned Miss Universe New Zealand in 2018.
Eva Duncan- Has signed with Ali Mcd models in Dunedin. She has taken several test shots and has been in runway shows for designers such as Igor Galas, Kwok Kei Ng, Tracey Klemick, Vaughan Geeson and more.
Holly Potton - Has taken several test shots and has been featured in a photographic ad for Herbal Essences. She's walked in runway shows for Ed Hardy, Anna Sui and Lucie Boshier. She was previously signed with August Models.
Jamie Himiona - She is signed with N Model Management and has taken some test shots for her portfolio.
Lara Kingsbeer - Signed with Red 11 Models and Talent and has shot for Glassons, Rouse Magazine and Zambesi Eyewear. Lara opened the World show for the finale of New Zealand's Next Top Model's 3rd season.
Lauren Bangs - Signed with 62 models in Auckland and has taken many test shots with photographers such as Mandy Phillip and Greg Novak.
Michaela Steenkamp - Currently signed with Red 11 Models and Talent in Auckland and Portfolio models in Christchurch. She has walked in a fashion show for Ballantynes. She has taken some test shots and some print work, such as for Anyone Girl and FashionMasters.
Nellie Jenkins - Nellie was previously signed with 62 models in Auckland and Ali Mcd models in Dunedin. Nellie has been featured in work for Mild Red, Zaibatsu Hair Expo, Rachel Webb, Kimberley Clarke and more. She has walked in runway shows for Charmaine Reveley, Sophie Hardy, Meg Gallagher, Mindy Stanley-Boden, Stephanie Miller, Faye Ma and more. She and her sister, Elza, are currently in London to pursue modeling.

References

External links

2010 New Zealand television seasons
Top Model
Television shows filmed in New Zealand
Television shows filmed in Thailand